The Springfield Public Schools is a comprehensive community public school district serving students in kindergarten through twelfth grade from Springfield Township, in Union County, New Jersey, United States.

As of the 2018–19 school year, the district, comprising five schools, had an enrollment of 2,273 students and 167.5 classroom teachers (on an FTE basis), for a student–teacher ratio of 13.6:1.

The district is classified by the New Jersey Department of Education as being in District Factor Group "GH", the third-highest of eight groupings. District Factor Groups organize districts statewide to allow comparison by common socioeconomic characteristics of the local districts. From lowest socioeconomic status to highest, the categories are A, B, CD, DE, FG, GH, I and J.

History
Springfield Township became one of the six constituent municipalities of the Union County Regional High School District when it was established, joining Berkeley Heights, Clark, Garwood, Kenilworth and Mountainside. The district opened for students in September 1937, with the district's first facility being Jonathan Dayton Regional High School in Springfield, which was named for founding father Jonathan Dayton. Amid conflict between the constituent municipalities about financing a district described as "the highest-spending regional high school in the state" and anger from residents impacted by the closure of David Brearley High School, a referendum was held in May 1996 in which voters approved a proposal to breakup the regional district. With the district's dissolution at the end of the 1996-97 school year Jonathan Dayton High School was turned over to the Springfield Public Schools, which became a K-12 district.

Schools 
Schools in the district (with 2018–19 enrollment data from the National Center for Education Statistics) are:
Elementary schools
Edward V. Walton Early Childhood Center with 627 students in grades PreK-2
Dr. Adriana B. Coppola, Principal
James Caldwell Elementary School with 255 students in grades 3-5
David Rennie, Principal
Thelma L. Sandmeier Elementary School with 261 students in grades 3-5
Michael C. Plias, Principal
Middle school
Florence M. Gaudineer Middle School with 512 students in grades 6-8
Timothy P. Kielty, Principal
High school
Jonathan Dayton High School with 578 students in grades 9-12
Dr. Norman Francis Jr., Principal

Administration
Core members of the district's administration are:
Michael A. Davino, Superintendent
Matthew Clarke, School Business Administrator / Board Secretary

Board of education
The district's board of education, comprised of nine members, sets policy and oversees the fiscal and educational operation of the district through its administration. As a Type II school district, the board's trustees are elected directly by voters to serve three-year terms of office on a staggered basis, with three seats up for election each year held (since 2012) as part of the November general election. The board appoints a superintendent to oversee the day-to-day operation of the district.

References

External links 
Springfield Public Schools 

School Data for the Springfield Public Schools, National Center for Education Statistics 

Springfield Township, Union County, New Jersey
New Jersey District Factor Group GH
School districts in Union County, New Jersey